Lorenzo's Time is a 2012 Philippine melodrama television series starring Zaijian Jaranilla and Carmina Villaroel. The series aired on ABS-CBN and worldwide on TFC from July 2, 2012 to October 5, 2012, replacing Dahil Sa Pag-ibig and was replaced by Ina, Kapatid, Anak.

This series was streaming on Jeepney TV YouTube Channel.

Series overview

Premise 
Lorenzo's Time is a story about a young boy named Lorenzo (Zaijan Jaranilla) who was diagnosed with progeria, an extremely rare genetic condition wherein symptoms resembling aspects of aging are manifested at an early age. In order to preserve his young body, he was subjected to cryonics until his parents find a cure for it. After 30 years, Enzo woke up to a world where he missed precious moments of his life, including his family and the only girl he loves.

Cast and characters

Main cast
 Zaijian Jaranilla as Lorenzo "Enzo" Montereal
 Carmina Villarroel as Kathy "Kat-Kat" Gonzales-Montereal

Supporting cast
 Amy Austria-Ventura as Mildred Montereal-Gamboa
 Gina Pareño as Bella "Ate Belle" Nobleza
 James Blanco as Jonas Silvestre / Archimedes "Archie" Montereal II
 Alfred Vargas as Dr. Carlo Ramirez
 Belle Mariano as Charity "Charie" Gonzales Montereal / young Kat-Kat Gonzales
 Joel Torre as Badong Gamboa
 Rommel Padilla as Vincent Castillo

Recurring cast 
 John Estrada as young Manuel Montereal
 Kaye Abad as young Mildred Montereal-Gamboa
 Tess Antonio as Sheryl Santiago
 Vino Martinez as Alfonso "Ali" Gamboa
 Cacai Bautista as Kikay

Guest cast 
 Isay Alvarez as Atty. Rachel Medina
 Emilio Garcia as Henry Robles
 Spanky Manikan as Luis Robles
 Jojo Alejar as Atty. Patrick Dominguez
 Joonee Gamboa as Fr. William Ramos
 Gerald Pesigan as Herbert Flores
 Nina Ricci Alagao as Natasha Magallanes

Special participation
 Tirso Cruz III as Manuel Montereal/ Mang Jose Nobleza
 Dimples Romana as Susan Montereal
 Eric Fructuoso as young Badong Gamboa
 Jannica Pareño as young Bella Nobleza
 John Wayne Sace as young Vincent Castillo
 Rain Quite as young Archie Montereal II
 Christian Vasquez as Dr. Mike Ramirez

Cameo appearances
 6 Cycle Mind
 Rico J. Puno
 Jinggoy Estrada

Production 
The series was announced on February 20, 2012. It was originally called as Frozen Boy before changing to its final title Lorenzo's Time. Production and principal photography of the series was done for 8 months from February 20 to October 5, 2012.

Reception 
Lorenzo's Time became an instant hit beating its competitor with 26.4% ratings share in Mega Manila according to the AGB Nielsen data and it posted an average of 29.2% ratings share nationwide according to the Kantar Media-TNS data. It became a trending topic worldwide and nationwide on its pilot episode with the audience and critics praising the show for its high concept and creativity.

Music 
Music plays an important part in Lorenzo's Time to express the drama's emotional, comedic and romantic sequences. The soundtrack is led by its first single, Times of Your Life by Martin Nievera.

Accolades

Awards and nominations

See also 
List of programs broadcast by ABS-CBN
List of programs aired by ABS-CBN
List of telenovelas of ABS-CBN

References

External links 

ABS-CBN drama series
Television series by Dreamscape Entertainment Television
2012 Philippine television series debuts
2012 Philippine television series endings
Philippine melodrama television series
Filipino-language television shows
Television shows set in the Philippines